Rafelcofer is a village in the Valencian Community, Spain. Its mayor has been Maria del Carmen Llibrer Ballester since her election in June, 2007.

Municipalities in the Province of Valencia
Safor